Bryan Antonio García Sirias (born 25 May 1995) is a Nicaraguan professional footballer who plays as a winger for the Real Estelí F.C.

International career

International goals
Scores and results list Nicaragua's goal tally first.

References

External links

1995 births
Living people
Association football midfielders
Nicaraguan men's footballers
Real Estelí F.C. players
Managua F.C. players
2017 Copa Centroamericana players
2017 CONCACAF Gold Cup players
Nicaragua international footballers